Copper(II) cyanurate (C3HCuN3O3) is an organic compound. It has very few uses, and is more often encountered accidentally, rather than actually synthesised.

It is often found when the copper concentration in an outdoor swimming pool is too high. It also occurs with heatpumps due to acid in the insulation, and it reacts with cyanuric acid (which is added as a chlorine stabilizer) to produce copper cyanurate. This phenomenon is called 'Purple Cyanurate', as it discolours the surfaces and the water of the pool to a purple shade.

Synthesis 
Copper cyanurate can be created by reacting cyanuric acid with copper oxide.

CuO + 2C3H3N3O3 → C3HCuN3O3 + H2O.

Joanneumite is a rare natural mineral found in bat guano with formula Cu(C3N3O3H2)2(NH3)2 which is an ammine.

By heating copper compounds, such as the nitrate or carbonate with molten urea up to 190°C, they are largely converted to the lavender coloured joanneumite compound. This is dissolved and then recrystallised from a hot strong ammonia solution. If instead a weak (2%) cold ammonia solution is used, the dark purple compound CuC3N3O3H•2NH3 is formed instead.

A green coloured copper cyanurate containing no extra water or ammonia ligands also exists: Cu3(C3N3O3)2.

Applications 
Copper cyanurate has no known practical uses. The only place it commonly occurs is as an adverse effect of high levels of copper in swimming pools, and is more commonly seen as a nuisance.

References

Copper(II) compounds
Triazines